Andres Valdez is an American social activist from Albuquerque, New Mexico.

Early life and education

Valdez was born in Denver, Colorado and raised in San Luis, Colorado. Though once employed as a carpenter, he now works as a professional activist.

Activism

In November 1997 Valdez was appointed by the city of Albuquerque to the "Task Force on Police Oversight," a city council convened advisory group formed to make recommendations on a new system of oversight for Albuquerque's police department. He requested appointment to a 2013 task force convened by the council to make a new series of recommendations on the police oversight system, though the council declined to make him a member.

Since 2002, Valdez has filed a variety of complaints and lawsuits against the city of Albuquerque and city officials, including former mayor Martin Chávez and current mayor Richard J. Berry, and has been involved in a number of demonstrations that have interrupted city meetings and events.

In 1997, and again in 2014, he attempted to serve "arrest warrants" he had self-signed against police officers. In 2006 Valdez and Gwen Packard led a protest prior to the city's Martin Luther King Jr. Day Parade saying they wanted to end the "glamorization of Native American oppression by Albuquerque's Tri-Centennial initiative." In 2010 Valdez received $10,000 in an out-of-court settlement by the city over a lawsuit he had brought after being ruled out-of-order during the public comment period at a police oversight commission meeting. During a May 2014 demonstration by Valdez and several dozen protesters at the chambers of the Albuquerque city council, Valdez announced a "coup d'etat" against the city's government. The city council president ultimately adjourned the meeting and it was reconvened several days later.

Political campaigns

In 1997 Valdez sought election to the Albuquerque city council, ultimately losing to Tim Kline with 13-percent of the vote.

In 2012 Valdez announced his candidacy for U.S. Senate. In an early debate he declared Martin Heinrich a "pup" who lacked life experience, though, subsequently withdrew from the race citing "the outrageous amount of money needed to run.”

References

American activists
People from Albuquerque, New Mexico
People from Denver
Year of birth missing (living people)
Living people
People from Costilla County, Colorado